Mordellochroa yanoi is a beetle in the genus Mordellochroa of the family Mordellidae. It was described in 1951 by Nomura.

References

Mordellidae
Beetles described in 1951